Sir Donald James Dundas Maitland  (16 August 192222 August 2010) was a senior British diplomat. He served as British Prime Minister Edward Heath's press secretary 1970 to 1974.

Early life 
Donald was the son of Thomas Maitland. He was born in Edinburgh, Scotland, and educated at George Watson's College and the University of Edinburgh.

Career 
Maitland joined the Foreign Service in 1947.

After serving as Heath's press secretary, he was appointed as Permanent Representative of the United Kingdom to the United Nations.

Maitland's expertise was in the Middle East where he served during World War II. Between 1956 and 1960 he was Director of the Middle East Centre for Arab Studies, Lebanon. In 1967 he became Principal Private Secretary to the Foreign Secretary and later Ambassador to Libya.

In June 1980 he was appointed Permanent Secretary at the Department of Energy, until his retirement from the civil service in December 1982.

He was appointed OBE in 1960, CMG in 1967, knighted in 1973 and appointed GCMG in 1977. In 1995, he was awarded an Honorary Degree (Doctor of Laws) by the University of Bath, and was their pro-chancellor from 1997 to 2000.

Personal life 
Maitland lived between Bath and Bradford on Avon. He married Jean Young in 1950, and had a son and a daughter.

References

External links
Interview with Sir Donald James Dundas Maitland & transcript, British Diplomatic Oral History Programme, Churchill College, Cambridge, 1997

1922 births
2010 deaths
Civil servants from Edinburgh
People educated at George Watson's College
Alumni of the University of Edinburgh
Members of HM Diplomatic Service
Ambassadors of the United Kingdom to Libya
Permanent Representatives of the United Kingdom to the United Nations
Knights Bachelor
Knights Grand Cross of the Order of St Michael and St George
Officers of the Order of the British Empire
Permanent Representatives of the United Kingdom to the European Union
Permanent Under-Secretaries of State for Energy
People associated with the University of Bath
Principal Private Secretaries to the Secretary of State for Foreign and Commonwealth Affairs
Diplomats from Edinburgh
20th-century British diplomats